Terrestrial refers to things related to land or the planet Earth.

Terrestrial may also refer to:

 Terrestrial animal, an animal that lives on land opposed to living in water, or sometimes an animal that lives on or near the ground, as opposed to arboreal life (in trees)
 A fishing fly that simulates the appearance of a land insect is referred to as a terrestrial fly.
 Terrestrial ecoregion, land ecoregions, as distinct from freshwater ecoregions and marine ecoregions
 Terrestrial ecosystem, an ecosystem found only on landforms
 Terrestrial gamma-ray flash, a burst of gamma rays produced in Earth's atmosphere
 Terrestrial locomotion, evolutionary adaptation from aquatic types of locomotion 
 Terrestrial plant, a plant that grows on land rather than in water or on rocks or trees
 Terrestrial planet, a planet that is primarily composed of silicate rocks, and thus "Earth-like"
 Terrestrial radio, radio signals received through a conventional aerial, as opposed to satellite radio
 Terrestrial radiation, due to the insolation of heat by the earth surface, earth re-radiates the heat to the atmosphere in the form of long waves
 Terrestrial reconnaissance, a type of reconnaissance that is employed along the elements of ground warfare
 Terrestrial reference frame, the reference frame as one views from earth
 Terrestrial television, television signals received through a conventional aerial, as opposed to satellite television or cable television
 Terrestrial Time, an astronomical time standard
 Terrestrial Trunked Radio, a specialist walkie talkie standard used by police departments, fire departments, ambulance services and the military
 Cretaceous Terrestrial Revolution, the intense diversification of land animals

See also
 Extraterrestrial (disambiguation)
 Terrestre (disambiguation)
 Terrestris
Degrees of glory#Terrestrial kingdom